"Silver Lady" is a popular single by David Soul. It was written by Tony Macaulay and Geoff Stephens and produced by Macaulay. It was released in 1977 and reached number one in the UK Singles Chart.

Background
"Silver Lady" was the second and final number one hit in the UK Singles Chart for David Soul, spending three weeks at the top in October 1977. It had spent five weeks in the top ten before eventually toppling Elvis Presley. The single also spent four weeks at number one in Ireland, and peaked at number five in Australia, but fared less well in his homeland peaking at No. 52 on the Billboard Hot 100 and at number No.23 on the Easy Listening chart. It can be found on his second album Playing To An Audience of One.

In the UK, the song was used in the 2013 film Filth, with David Soul miming the song while he kerb crawls in his car at night, eventually picking up a prostitute, with group of female singers in the back seat singing the chorus, and a 2014 television advert for bus operator National Express in which Soul is featured as a coach driver. As a result, the song re-entered the UK Charts at No.145 in June 2014. A compilation album of Soul's hits was subsequently released, also entering the UK top 200.. This song is also loved by Peter Kay, being used in many references during the classic comedy: Phoenix Nights.

Charts

Weekly charts

Year-end charts

Certifications

References

1977 songs
1977 singles
David Soul songs
Songs written by Geoff Stephens
Songs written by Tony Macaulay
UK Singles Chart number-one singles
Irish Singles Chart number-one singles
Private Stock Records singles